Suently Alberto (born 9 June 1996) is a professional footballer who plays as a centre back. He has earned caps for the Curaçao national football team.

Club career
Alberto made his professional debut as Jong PSV player in the second division on 28 March 2014 against Fortuna Sittard in a 2–1 away defeat. He played the full game. During the 2013–14, he managed to play 3 games for Jong PSV. In the 14–15 season he made his debut for the first squad in the match against Heracles Almelo. For the Jong PSV squad he played that season in 18 matches (2 goals).

International career
A former youth international for the Netherlands, Alberto opted to represent the Curaçao national football team. Alberto made his debut for Curaçao in a 2-1 friendly win over Qatar on 10 October 2017.

References

External links

 
Profile - Jong PSV
Netherlands profile

1996 births
Living people
Footballers from Rotterdam
Curaçao footballers
Curaçao international footballers
Dutch footballers
Dutch expatriate footballers
Netherlands youth international footballers
Dutch people of Curaçao descent
Association football central defenders
PSV Eindhoven players
Jong PSV players
NEC Nijmegen players
Sparta Rotterdam players
CS Pandurii Târgu Jiu players
Eredivisie players
Eerste Divisie players
Liga III players
Expatriate footballers in Romania
Dutch expatriate sportspeople in Romania